The men's 400 metres at the 2012 IPC Athletics European Championships was held at Stadskanaal Stadium from 24–28 July.

Medalists
Results given by IPC Athletics.

Results

T12
Heats

Final

T36
Heats

Final

T38
Final

T46
Final

T53
Final

T54
Final

See also
List of IPC world records in athletics

References

400 metres
400 metres at the World Para Athletics European Championships